Tam cúc (三菊, "three chrysanthemums") is a multi-trick card game popular in Northern Vietnam. Tam Cuc is not just played for entertainment, but also played in ceremonies and festivals. It is a card game that is commonly played in New Year celebrations, it a habit of northerner to play this game while wait for the banh chung to cook. Tam cúc is mostly played by women because the number of cards is less than in the Tổ tôm, which is more common among men. It is similar to the games of Chēmǎbāo, Zhìhǔ, and Giog.

Card set

A deck of tam cúc has 32 cards with 2 kinds of set red and black. Each set has 1 general (tướng 將), 2 majors (sĩ 士), 2 elephants (tượng 象), 2 carts (xe 車), 2 cannons (pháo 砲), 2 horses (mã 馬), and 5 soldiers (tốt 卒). The black side general is called tướng bà (female general), and red side is called tướng ông(male general). Red side majors are called sĩ điều. The rest of the cards are addressed by their name and color. The deck of the tam cúc is similar to Cờ tướng pieces, while Chữ Hán (Chinese characters) are as same as pieces of black side.

Rules

Setting
The Tam Cuc deck is divided from high to low in rank, with General as the highest card, followed by Major, Elephant, Cart, Cannon, Horse and Soldier. A card in the red suit is worth more than a black card of the same rank.

Combinations of cards are:
Pair
 same color same rank ex: pair of red cannons, or pair of black majors.
Three card combo
 General + major + elephant; or cart + cannon + horse. However, major + elephant + cart; or elephant + cart + cannon are not a three card combo.
Four sons
 4 soldier cards of the same color.
Five sons
 5 soldier cards of the same color.

How to play
Tam Cuc can be played with 4, 3, or 2 players. When played with three players one red soldier and one black soldier will not be used, or a total of five cards are discarded: the two generals, both of red and black majors, and 1 red soldier and 1 black soldier.

At first one-person will shuffle the deck of card and another will play as the House. The way to become the House is that players will each call out the name of the card general, majors, elephant, cart, cannon, horse, and soldier and the card will be deal until the called get the card that they called and become the House. The following house will be establishing the person on the right of the previous House. The House allows dealing the card and goes first. The deck of card is deal out until the end. The house will lay down the cards first and called out for how many card going he be play single card, two cards, or three cards. The following person will lay down the number of card the same as the number being called out face down. When all the players placed down their cards, starting with the house each player will flip their cards up and the one with the highest hand will become the House and the process starts again until end. An exception is that every player allows accept defeated and hides their hand to keep their cards secret. All played cards get collected and discarded as trash.

Special cases
If a player has four or five soldiers of the same colour (four sons or five sons), they show their hand and win automatically, becoming the House.

When the last ground is play, if the House calls a black soldier pair (the lowest hand possible) and if the hand is win then it become pair and more point will be added to the player. Also, when the last ground is play, if the House calls three black soldiers and if the hand is win then it become 3 of a kind and more point will be added to the player. In some area the player allow to exchange their cards in secret face-down to make better to both side of the players. This is called đi đêm ("night walker").

Tam Cuc in literature
Tam Cuc is a common game among the people. It has become a trademark for New Years and other large festivals or celebrations so many famous Vietnamese poets and writers had talked about this game in their work.
The famous poet Hoàng Cầm wrote in his poem “Cây Tam Cúc”:
...Tướng sĩ đỏ đen chui sấp ngửa
Ổ rơm thơm đọng tuổi đương thì...

...Em đi đêm tướng điều sĩ đỏ
Đổi xe hồng đưa Chị đến quê Em...

...Thả tịnh vàng cưới Chị võng mây trôi
Em đứng nhìn theo Em gọi đôi.
The famous poet Hồ Dzếnh described the Tam Cúc deck:
"...Từ đó mỗi mùa đào nở
Pháo xe lại rộn cây bài
Có độ anh về, có độ
Vắng anh, em nhớ mong hoài..." 
Poet Trần Đăng Khoa in a poem about playing Tam Cúc:
"Đây là tướng ông
Chân đi hài đỏ
Đây là tướng bà
Tóc hiu hiu gió
Đây là con ngựa
Chân có bụi đường"

References 

 

Chinese card games
Vietnamese games
Vietnamese words and phrases
Dedicated deck card games